is a Japanese retired judoka.

She participated at the 2018 World Judo Championships, winning a medal.

In 2021, she won the gold medal in her event at the 2021 Judo World Masters held in Doha, Qatar.

She won one of the bronze medals in her event at the 2022 Judo Grand Slam Paris held in Paris, France.

References

External links
 
 

1989 births
Living people
Japanese female judoka
World judo champions
20th-century Japanese women
21st-century Japanese women